Jeanette Borhyová (born September 12, 1992)  is a Slovak beauty pageant titleholder who was crowned Miss Universe Slovenskej Republiky 2013 and represented her country in the 2013 Miss Universe pageant.

Early life
She is a student of Economics. Her hobbies are Dancing, Volleyball, Snowboarding and Fitness.

Miss Universe Slovenskej Republiky 2013
A Blonde beauty Jeanette Borhyova from Ivanka pri Dunaji has been crowned Miss Universe SR 2013 at the grand finale of the 15th edition of Miss Universe Slovenskej Republiky beauty pageant. Miss Universe SR 2013 beauty contest took place at the Aegon NTC, Arena, Bratislava on Thursday night of 4 April 2013. 12 Beauties have selected for the Miss Slovak Republic 2013 contest.

References

External links
Official Miss Universe Slovenskej Republiky website

1992 births
Living people
Slovak beauty pageant winners
Miss Universe 2013 contestants
People from Senec District